CL-218,872 is a sedative and hypnotic drug used in scientific research. It has similar effects to sedative-hypnotic benzodiazepine drugs such as triazolam, but is structurally distinct and so is classed as a nonbenzodiazepine hypnotic.

CL-218,872 is a GABAA partial agonist which is selective for the α1 subtype. It has a range of effects including sedative, hypnotic, anxiolytic, anticonvulsant and amnestic actions, however the most prominent actions are sedation and amnesia, and CL-218,872 produces effects very similar to those of the hypnotic imidazopyridine derivative zolpidem in animal studies.

References 

Sedatives
Triazolopyridazines
Trifluoromethyl compounds
GABAA receptor positive allosteric modulators